Josh Heinrich Taves (a.k.a. Josh Heinrich; born May 13, 1972, in Watsonville, California) is a former professional American football player.

Biography
Taves is Jewish.  He grew up in Truro, MA, played football for Dennis-Yarmouth Regional High School, and for Northeastern University, where he twice made the Jewish All-American team.

He was named NFL Europe's 1998 Most Valuable Defensive Player, after he was co-leader in sacks in the league with 9 in 10 games for the Barcelona Dragons.

In the National Football League, he played defensive end for 29 games over three seasons for the Oakland Raiders and the Carolina Panthers.

See also
List of select Jewish football players

References

1972 births
Living people
People from Watsonville, California
Jewish American sportspeople
Players of American football from California
American football defensive ends
Northeastern Huskies football players
Detroit Lions players
Jacksonville Jaguars players
New England Patriots players
Miami Dolphins players
Barcelona Dragons players
Oakland Raiders players
Carolina Panthers players
21st-century American Jews